TreeSize is a disk space analyzer written by JAM Software. TreeSize has native 32 and 64-bit support for all Windows versions and client/server versions currently supported by Microsoft.

Functionality
The common functionality of all editions is to determine and to display drive/folder sizes, and to create reports such as tables and charts (pie chart, bar chart or treemaps).  The collected data can be exported to plain text, clipboard, HTML, XML, or Microsoft Excel formats.

The Professional and Personal Editions enable a user to search specifically for large, old, or obsolete files, e.g. temporary files, duplicates or caches of web-browsers such as Internet Explorer, Mozilla Firefox, or Opera. Duplicate files can be identified via MD5- or SHA256-checksums and duplicated or replaced by hardlinks.

TreeSize can also monitor disk space usage development. The software either compares XML reports or uses shadow copies created by Windows itself or by the user.

As of version 3.4, TreeSize Free can scan mobile devices connected to a computer via the Media Transfer Protocol. Android devices can be scanned via WebDAV.

TreeSize can access not only mobile devices but will also scan SharePoint, Amazon S3 Storage and FTP servers.

History
The first version of TreeSize was programmed by Joachim Marder in 1996. It was designed to offer the features of Unix's du on Windows systems, with the addition of a GUI. The software tried to overcome the drawbacks of both the du command and Windows Explorer's right-click context menu. One year later, the newly founded German company JAM Software published TreeSize in a freeware and two shareware versions.

In October 2012 a freeware version with a touch-optimized interface was released for Windows mobile phones, available in Windows Store.

Version 7.1 was released in May 2019.

References

External links
 
 Review on PC World. Additionally, PC World reported on two occasions about TreeSize in their print magazine; once in the Hungarian edition of August 2007, p. 66-67, authored by Tószegi Szabolcs. The second report was printed in the German edition of July 2007, p. 62 authored by cmd. 
 Review on 3d2f.com
 Article on XML.com
 Article on Techrepublic.com
 Article on Techtree.com

Disk usage analysis software